Frank Edward Hankinson (April 29, 1856 – April 5, 1911) was an American third baseman in the early years of Major League Baseball. He played for the Chicago White Stockings (1878–1879), Cleveland Blues (1880), Troy Trojans (1881), New York Gothams (1883–1884), New York Metropolitans (1885–1887), and Kansas City Cowboys (1888). The Metropolitans and the Cowboys were members of the American Association, while his previous teams were all members of the still-existing National League.

Born in New York City, Hankinson was, for the most part, a third baseman, but over the course of his career he played at every position except catcher; he pitched in 32 games, starting 28 of them. Almost all of his pitching came in 1879 with the White Stockings, when he was 15–10 in 25 starts. He was 16–12 with a solid 2.50 ERA in 266 innings pitched in his career. Hankinson completed all 28 of his starts, 2 of them shutouts.

In a 10-season career, Hankinson batted .228 with 13 home runs and 344 RBIs. He had 122 doubles and a total of 747 hits in 3272 at bats.

Twenty-four days before his 55th birthday, he died in Palisades Park, New Jersey.

External links

1856 births
1911 deaths
Major League Baseball third basemen
Chicago White Stockings players
Cleveland Blues (NL) players
Troy Trojans players
New York Gothams players
New York Metropolitans players
Kansas City Cowboys players
19th-century baseball players
Baseball players from New York (state)
Burials at Green-Wood Cemetery
Alaskas players
New York Metropolitans (minor league) players
Ottawa Modocs players